The Toronto Rock are a lacrosse team based in Toronto playing in the National Lacrosse League (NLL). The 2020 season is the 23rd in franchise history, and 22nd as the Rock. Due to the COVID-19 pandemic, the season was suspended on March 12, 2020. On April 8, the league made a further public statement announcing the cancellation of the remaining games of the 2020 season and that they would be exploring options for playoffs once it was safe to resume play. On February 3, 2021, the NLL announced that plans for an abbreviated spring season were cancelled due to travel and logistics uncertainty, and that their focus will move toward playing a full 2021–22 NLL season.

Regular season

Final standings

Game log

Cancelled games

Roster

Entry Draft
The 2019 NLL Entry Draft took place on September 17, 2019. The Toronto Rock made the following selections:

References

Toronto
Toronto Rock
2020 in Canadian sports